Russell Donnithorne Walker (13 February 1842 – 29 March 1922) was an English cricketer, barrister and cricket administrator.

Russell Walker was born in Southgate, Middlesex. He was the sixth of seven cricket playing brothers, who were influential in the establishing of the Middlesex County Cricket Club in 1864. Their cricket ground at Southgate is maintained by the Walker Trust to this day.

He played as a right-handed batsman and a round arm slow right arm bowler for Oxford University (1861–1865), a Middlesex XI (1862), Marylebone Cricket Club (MCC) (1862–1878) and Middlesex County Cricket Club (1864–1877).

After graduating from Oxford (where he was at Brasenose College) in 1865, he studied law at Lincoln's Inn and was called to the bar in 1871. He succeeded his brother Edward as President of Middlesex and served in this role from 1907 until his death at Regent's Park, aged 80.

See also
 The Walkers of Southgate

References

External links
 
 
 Middlesex County Cricket Club Hall of Fame

1842 births
1922 deaths
English cricketers
Middlesex cricketers
Oxford University cricketers
Presidents of Middlesex County Cricket Club
People from Southgate, London
Gentlemen of the South cricketers
Gentlemen cricketers
North v South cricketers
Marylebone Cricket Club cricketers
Southgate cricketers
Gentlemen of England cricketers
Russell
Alumni of Brasenose College, Oxford
People educated at Harrow School
Cricketers from Greater London
Gentlemen of Middlesex cricketers
Gentlemen of Marylebone Cricket Club cricketers
North of the Thames v South of the Thames cricketers
R. D. Walker's XI cricketers